Waking the Witch may refer to:

 The use of sleep deprivation in Witch trials in early modern Scotland
 Waking the Witch (band), a British band
 Waking the Witch (novel), a novel in the Women of the Otherworld series by Kelley Armstrong
 "Waking the Witch", a song by Kate Bush from the album Hounds of Love